SECMA (Société d'Etude et de Construction de Mecanique Automobile) is a French automobile manufacturer located in Aniche, France.

History
The company was founded by Daniel Renard in 1995. His first microcar business was Automobiles ERAD, founded in 1975.

The design of the first Secma model in 1995 responded to Daniel Renard's desire to create the simplest possible car, for less than 20,000 F at the time (3,000 euros).

On 27 May 2009, SECMA's factory was destroyed by fire. The company then moved into new, more modern and functional facilities. In parallel with the production of its flagship model, the Secma F16, in 2012 the Secma Fun Lander was launched. By 2014, around 30,000 Secma and ERAD vehicles had been manufactured - averaging out at about 750 per year since the beginning.

At the 2016 Geneva Motor Show, the Secma F16 Turbo was unveiled. One year after, Secma launched the Fun Buggy, a model with more ground clearance and a Buggy look.

Models
 1995 - 2018: Fun Tech 340 / Fun Quad 340
 1995 - 2018: Fun Elec’
 1995 - 2018: Fun Buggy 340cc
 1995 - 2018: 6x4 
 1995 - 2018: Fun Extr’m 500 / F440 DCI
 1995 - 2018: Fun Runner
 1995 - 2018: Fun Family
 2016 - Current: Secma F16/F16 Turbo
 2017 - Current: Secma Fun Buggy
 Qpod

References

External links
 

Car manufacturers of France
Quadricycles
French brands